The 2015–16 I-League 2nd Division was the ninth edition of the I-League 2nd division, the second-highest division in India.

League structure
The 2015–16 I-League 2nd division matches to be played on a home and away basis. The preliminary rounds will be played in the ‘conference’ system with the teams being divided into Eastern and Western conferences. Top 3 teams from each conference will qualify for the final round of the 2015–2016 season of 2nd division I-League.

The 10-team I-League second division commenced on 14 November.

Team overview

The following clubs participated in the 2nd Division League 2015–16, subject to fulfillment of the Club Licensing criteria.

Foreign players
Restricting the number of foreign players strictly to three per team. A team could use two foreign players on the field each game.

Group A - Eastern Conference
All times are Indian Standard Time (IST) – UTC+05:30.

Table

Fixtures and results

Group B - Western Conference
All times are Indian Standard Time (IST) – UTC+05:30.

Table

Fixtures and results

Final round

Statistics

Top scorers

See also
2015–16 I-League
2015 ISL Season
2015–16 I-League U18

References

External links
 

I-League 2nd Division seasons
3